David Donald "Doodie" Bloomfield (8 August 1918 – 14 November 1950) was a Canadian basketball player. He competed in the men's tournament at the 1948 Summer Olympics.

Personal life
Bloomfield served in the Royal Canadian Air Force during the Second World War.

References

1918 births
1950 deaths
Canadian men's basketball players
Olympic basketball players of Canada
Basketball players at the 1948 Summer Olympics
Basketball players from Montreal
Royal Canadian Air Force personnel of World War II